Hamzehlu-ye Olya (also Romanized as Ḩamzehlū-ye ‘Olyā; also known as Ḩamzeh ‘Alī Bālā, Ḩamzeh ‘Alī-ye Bālā, and Ḩamzehlū-ye Bālā) is a village in Kamazan-e Vosta Rural District, Zand District, Malayer County, Hamadan Province, Iran. According to the 2006 census, its population is 183, with a total of 42 families living in the village.

References 

Populated places in Malayer County